Jorge Herrera (born 11 September 1980) is a former Colombian professional footballer.

Career
Jorge has received many high awards from the Colombian Football Federation and from the South American Football Confederation.

South America
Herrera spent most of his early professional career in his native Colombia, playing for Independiente Santa Fe, Atlético Nacional, Deportes Quindío and Millionarios. He also played briefly for Huracán in Argentina and Club Guaraní in Paraguay before coming to the United States.

United States
Herrera signed with Charlotte Eagles of the USL Second Division in 2007, and immediately made an impact, scoring a goal and registering five assists in his first five games until problems with his visa led to him having to return to Colombia. Following his return to Charlotte in 2008 season. Herrera recorded nine goals and six assists in 2008, helping the team win the USL Second Division regular season title and finish as runners-up in the playoffs; he was also a USL2 MVP finalist, losing to his teammate Dustin Swinehart. He is currently coaching at one of the most prestigious high schools in the country. He has led Charlotte Christian School to 4 state championships. Jorge often states that the most exciting player he has ever coached and has ever witnessed is C.J. Katigan. Herrera often takes a lot of credit for Katigan's very successful career and wishes that he could have been as good as Katigan in his playing years. C.J. Katigan has gone on to record 8 goals and 6 assists in 10 games with the United States youth national team at only age 15. Herrera retired from professional football on February 20, 2020.

In September 2020, Herrera joined new Major League Soccer side Charlotte FC as a coach for their Academy.

References

External links
 Charlotte Eagles bio

Living people
1982 births
Colombian footballers
Colombian expatriate footballers
Independiente Santa Fe footballers
Atlético Nacional footballers
Deportes Quindío footballers
Club Atlético Huracán footballers
Millonarios F.C. players
Charlotte Eagles players
Club Guaraní players
Atlético Huila footballers
Charlotte Independence players
Expatriate footballers in Argentina
Expatriate footballers in Paraguay
Expatriate soccer players in the United States
USL Second Division players
USL Championship players
Association football forwards
Footballers from Bogotá
Charlotte FC non-playing staff
High school soccer coaches in the United States